"(Ah, the Apple Trees) When the World Was Young" is a popular song composed by , with lyrics by . The English lyrics were written by Johnny Mercer. The original French title was "Le Chevalier de Paris". Apart from a reference to apples, the English lyrics only have minor commonalities with the original French words.

English lyrics were originally written by Carl Sigman, but these were rejected by the music publisher, Mickey Goldsen. Sigman suggested Mercer, and Mercer wrote the English lyrics (three verses and three choruses) in three days.

The song is from the perspective of an aging Parisian "boulevardier"/"coquette", as they review their life.

Notable recordings
Edith Piaf - as "Le chevalier de Paris" (1950)
Bing Crosby - recorded in Los Angeles on October 4, 1951 with John Scott Trotter and His Orchestra 
Peggy Lee - Black Coffee (1953)
Polly Bergen - Little Girl Blue (1955)
Jane Morgan - The American Girl from Paris (1956)
June Christy - Gone for the Day (1957)
Eydie Gormé - Eydie In Love (1958)
Dinah Shore - Moments Like These (1958)
Eartha Kitt - The Romantic Eartha (1962)
Julie London - Sophisticated Lady (1962)
Anita O'Day - Anita O'Day and the Three Sounds (1962) 
Frank Sinatra - Point of No Return (1962)
Marlene Dietrich - as "Die Welt war jung" (1962) (lyrics by Max Colpet)
Sheila Jordan - Portrait of Sheila (1962)
Nat King Cole - Where Did Everyone Go? (1963)
Morgana King - With A Taste of Honey, as medley with "Young and Foolish" (1964)
Blossom Dearie - Blossom Time at Ronnie Scott's (1966)
Nancy Wilson - Lush Life (1968) with altered English lyrics (uncredited)
Aretha Franklin - Soft and Beautiful (1969)
Scott Walker - Scott: Scott Walker Sings Songs from his T.V. Series (1969)
Mel Tormé - Tormé: A New Album (1977)
Mabel Mercer - Echoes of My Life (1980)
Mark Murphy - The Dream (2000)
Bob Dylan - Triplicate (2017)

References

1950 songs
French-language songs
Songs with lyrics by Johnny Mercer
Songs about old age